Ramiro Moschen Benetti (born 22 May 1993), simply known as Ramiro, is a Brazilian professional footballer who plays for Cruzeiro. Mainly a defensive midfielder, he can also play as a right defender.

Career
Born in Gramado, Rio Grande do Sul, Ramiro began his career on Juventude. He made his professional debut on 13 February 2011, against Lajeandense in Campeonato Gaúcho. He scored his first goal on 30 March, in a 3–2 home win over Grêmio.

In December, Ramiro was transferred to Grêmio, after a partnership was established with Juventude. He made his Grêmio debut on 20 January 2013, against Esportivo. On 1 June, Ramiro made his Série A debut, playing the last 29 minutes in a 1–1 away draw against Santos. In April 2014, Ramiro revealed in an interview that is Grêmio supporter since childhood, despite having acquired affection for Juventude. His dream was to play a Copa Libertadores de América by the club, which held in 2013.

On 13 December 2018, Ramiro joined Corinthians on a deal running until 2022.

Career statistics

Honours

Club
Juventude
Copa FGF: 2011, 2012

Grêmio
Copa do Brasil: 2016
Copa Libertadores: 2017
Recopa Sudamericana: 2018
Campeonato Gaúcho: 2018

Corinthians
Campeonato Paulista: 2019

References

External links
Ramiro profile. Portal Oficial do Grêmio. 

1993 births
Living people
Sportspeople from Rio Grande do Sul
Brazilian people of Italian descent
Brazilian footballers
Brazilian expatriate footballers
Association football defenders
Association football midfielders
Campeonato Brasileiro Série A players
Campeonato Brasileiro Série D players
UAE Pro League players
Esporte Clube Juventude players
Grêmio Foot-Ball Porto Alegrense players
Sport Club Corinthians Paulista players
Al-Wasl F.C. players
Cruzeiro Esporte Clube players
Expatriate footballers in the United Arab Emirates
Brazilian expatriate sportspeople in the United Arab Emirates